Alan Robert Kuntz (June 4, 1919March 7, 1987) was a professional ice hockey player from Toronto who played 45 games in the National Hockey League (NHL). He played with the New York Rangers. He was the father of former NHL player Murray Kuntz, and grandfather of current NHLPA Agent Murray Kuntz Jr.

External links

1919 births
1987 deaths
Canadian ice hockey left wingers
Ice hockey people from Toronto
New York Rangers players